The 2021 UEFA Women's Under-17 Championship qualifying competition is a women's under-17 football competition that will determine the seven teams joining the automatically qualified hosts Faroe Islands in the 2021 UEFA Women's Under-17 Championship final tournament. Players born on or after 1 January 2004 were eligible to participate.

Apart from the Faroe Islands, 48 of the remaining 54 UEFA member national teams entered the qualifying competition, where the original format consisted of two rounds: Qualifying round, which would have take place in autumn 2020, and Elite round, which would also have taken place in spring 2021. However, due to the COVID-19 pandemic in Europe, UEFA announced on 13 August 2020 that after consultation with the 55 member associations, the qualifying round was delayed to February 2021, and the elite round was abolished and replaced by play-offs, contested in March 2021 by the 12 qualifying round group winners and two best runners-up to determine the teams qualifying for the final tournament.

On 18 December 2020, the UEFA Executive Committee announced that the tournament had been cancelled after consultation with all 55 member associations due to the ongoing COVID-19 pandemic.

Format
The qualifying competition originally consisted of the following two rounds:
 Qualifying round: The 48 teams were to be drawn into 12 groups of four teams. Each group would have been played in single round-robin format at one of the teams selected as hosts after the draw. The 12 group winners, the 12 runners-up, and the four third-placed teams with the best record against the first and second-placed teams in their group were to advance to the elite round.
 Elite round: The 28 teams were to be drawn into seven groups of four teams. Each group would have been played in single round-robin format at one of the teams selected as hosts after the draw. The seven group winners were to qualify for the final tournament.

After the format change, the qualifying competition consisted of the following two rounds:
Qualifying round: The draw remained the same as before. The 12 group winners and the two runners-up with the best record against the first and third-placed teams in their group were to advance to the play-offs.
Play-offs: The 14 teams were to be drawn into seven ties. The seven winners would have qualified for the final tournament.

Qualifying round

Draw
The draw for the qualifying round was held on 29 November 2019, 09:00 CET (UTC+1), at the UEFA headquarters in Nyon, Switzerland.

The teams were seeded according to their coefficient ranking, calculated based on the following:
2016 UEFA Women's Under-17 Championship final tournament and qualifying competition (qualifying round and elite round)
2017 UEFA Women's Under-17 Championship final tournament and qualifying competition (qualifying round and elite round)
2018 UEFA Women's Under-17 Championship final tournament and qualifying competition (qualifying round and elite round)
2019 UEFA Women's Under-17 Championship final tournament and qualifying competition (qualifying round and elite round)

Each group contained one team from Pot A, one team from Pot B, one team from Pot C, and one team from Pot D. Based on the decisions taken by the UEFA Emergency Panel, the following pairs of teams could not be drawn in the same group: Russia and Ukraine, Russia and Kosovo, Serbia and Kosovo, Bosnia and Herzegovina and Kosovo, Azerbaijan and Armenia.

Notes
Teams marked in bold have qualified for the final tournament.

Groups
The qualifying round was originally scheduled to be played by 8 November 2020, but some groups were later rescheduled to late November. However, due to the COVID-19 pandemic in Europe, UEFA announced on 13 August 2020 that after consultation with the 55 member associations, the qualifying round was delayed to February 2021.<ref name="UEFA20200813"/

Times are CET (UTC+1), as listed by UEFA (local times, if different, are in parentheses).

Group 1
Originally scheduled to be played between 8–14 October, later rescheduled to 10–16 November 2020.

Group 2
Originally scheduled to be played between 3–9 September, later rescheduled to 2–8 November 2020.

Group 3
Originally scheduled to be played between 2–8 November, later rescheduled to 16–22 November 2020.

Group 4
Originally scheduled to be played between 3–9 October 2020.

Group 5
Originally scheduled to be played between 2–8 October, later rescheduled to 31 October – 6 November 2020.

Group 6
Originally scheduled to be played between 1–7 October, later rescheduled to 25–31 October 2020.

Group 7
Originally scheduled to be played between 28 September – 4 October, later rescheduled to 15–21 November 2020.

Group 8
Originally scheduled to be played between 10–16 October, later rescheduled to 21–27 October 2020.

Group 9
Originally scheduled to be played between 7–13 October, later rescheduled to 1–7 November 2020.

Group 10
Originally scheduled to be played between 14–20 October 2020.

Group 11
Originally scheduled to be played between 21–27 October 2020.

Group 12
Originally scheduled to be played between 8–14 October, later rescheduled to 8–14 November 2020.

Ranking of second-placed teams
To determine the two best second-placed teams from the qualifying round which would have advanced to the play-offs, only the results of the second-placed teams against the first and third-placed teams in their group were to be taken into account.

Elite round
The draw for the elite round would originally be held on 8 December 2020 at the UEFA headquarters in Nyon, Switzerland, and the matches were originally scheduled to be played in spring 2021. However, due to the COVID-19 pandemic in Europe, UEFA announced on 13 August 2020 that after consultation with the 55 member associations, the elite round was abolished and replaced by play-offs.<ref name="UEFA20200813"/

Play-offs
The 14 teams were to be drawn into seven ties. The seven winners would have qualified for the final tournament. The play-offs were scheduled to be played in March 2021.<ref name="UEFA20200813"/
Qualified teams
Group 1 winner
Group 2 winner
Group 3 winner
Group 4 winner
Group 5 winner
Group 6 winner
Group 7 winner
Group 8 winner
Group 9 winner
Group 10 winner
Group 11 winner
Group 12 winner
1st best runner-up
2nd best runner-up

Times up to 27 March 2021 are CET (UTC+1), thereafter times are CEST (UTC+2), as listed by UEFA (local times, if different, are in parentheses).

Qualified teams
The following eight teams were to qualify for the final tournament.

1 Bold indicates champions for that year. Italic indicates hosts for that year.

References

External links

Women's Under-17 Matches: 2021 Qualifying, UEFA.com

Qualification
2021
2020 in women's association football
2021 in women's association football
2020 in youth association football
2021 in youth association football
February 2021 sports events in Europe
March 2021 sports events in Europe
Association football events cancelled due to the COVID-19 pandemic